The women's triple jump at the 2010 African Championships in Athletics was held on August 1.

Results

External links
Results

Triple
Triple jump at the African Championships in Athletics
2010 in women's athletics